The 2022 FIBA 3x3 World Cup was held in Antwerp, Belgium and was contested by 20 teams.

Serbia won their fifth title with a win over Lithuania.

Participating teams
All five FIBA zones were represented. The top 20 teams, including the hosts, based on the FIBA National Federation ranking qualified for the tournament.

After the exclusion of Russia due to the 2022 Russian invasion of Ukraine, Slovenia was named as the replacement team.

Players

Preliminary round
The pools were announced on April 4, 2022. The schedule was released on May 12, 2022.

Pool A

Pool B

Pool C

Pool D

Knockout stage

Final standings

Statistics and awards

Statistical leaders

Awards

Individual awards
The awards were announced on 26 June 2022.

References

External links
Official website

Men
Sports events affected by the 2022 Russian invasion of Ukraine